Fotbal Club Pucioasa, commonly known as FC Pucioasa, or simply as Pucioasa, is Romanian football club from Pucioasa, Dâmbovița County. Until June 2018, the club was named as FC Aninoasa and played at Aninoasa. It currently plays in the Liga III.

History

The club was founded in 1985 as FC Aninoasa and mostly played in the Liga IV.

The club won Liga IV – Dâmbovița County twice, in 2014 and 2015, but succeeded to promote only the second time, when they won the promotion play-off match against Unirea Bascov, Argeș County champions, 4–2 on aggregate.

After three mediocre Liga III seasons, in which occupied following places: 11th (2015–16), 12th (2016–17) and 10th (2017–18), commune of Aninoasa decided to withdraw its financial support sending the team down to dissolution. The save came from just 15 kilometers away, from the town of Pucioasa, a town of which teams were dissolved one by one, being absent from the first three leagues for years. The team was moved in the summer of 2018 and changed its name from FC Aninoasa to FC Pucioasa.

Honours

Domestic

Leagues
Liga III
Winners (1): 2021–22
Liga IV – Dâmbovița County
Winners (2): 2013–14, 2014–15

Players

First team squad

Out on loan

Club officials

Board of directors

Current technical staff

League history

References

External links
Official website 

Association football clubs established in 1985
Football clubs in Dâmbovița County
Liga III clubs
Liga IV clubs
1985 establishments in Romania